Melrose Apartments may refer to:

Melrose Apartments (St. Louis, Missouri), listed on the National Register of Historic Places (NRHP) in St. Louis, Missouri
 Melrose Apartments (Omaha, Nebraska), listed on the NRHP in Nebraska as The Melrose